Halanaeroarchaeum sulfurireducens is a halophilic archaeon in the family of Halobacteriaceae and the only described species in the genus Halanaeroarchaeum (common abbreviation Haa.). In contrast to many of the known related halophilic archaea, H. sulfurireducens is anaerobic.

References

Halobacteria
Monotypic archaea genera
Archaea genera
Taxa described in 2016

Archaea described in 2016